Homoine District is a district of Inhambane Province in south-east Mozambique. Its principal town is Vila de Homoine. The district is located at the east of the province, and borders with Morrumbene District in the north, Jangamo District in the southeast, Inharrime District in the south, Panda District in the west, and Funhalouro District in the northwest. In the east, the district is bounded by the Indian Ocean. It has a population of 107.475 as of 2007.

Geography
The principal rivers in the district are the Domo-Domo River, the Nhanombe River, and the Nhalihave River. There are two lakes, Lake Pembe and Lake Nhavarre.

The climate is tropical semi-arid, with the annual rainfall being . Savanna occupies the largest part of the district.

Administrative divisions
The district is divided into two postos, Homoine (seven localities, including Vila de Homoine, the administrative center of the district) and Pembe (two localities).

Demographics
As of 2005, 42% of the population of the district was younger than 15 years. 49% did speak Portuguese, and the most common mothertongue was Chopi. 53% were analphabetic, mostly women. The population density in Homoine District is higher than in other districts of Inhambane Province.

Economy
The economy in the interior of the district was badly damaged by the civil war. For example, out of 103 lodges which existed before the war, only 49 were in operation after the war. 1% of the households have electricity.

There is exploitation of white sand deposits, as well as of stone for construction, on a relatively small scale.

Agriculture
In the district, there are 23,000 farms which have on average  of land. The main agricultural products are corn, cassava, cowpea, peanut, sweet potato, rice, and sorghum.

Transportation

References

Districts in Inhambane Province